Jonah Kinigstein (born June 26, 1923) is an American artist known for his Expressionist paintings.

Early life and education
Kinigstein was born on June 26, 1923 in Brooklyn, New York City. His parents were Jewish immigrants from Russia and Poland. As a teenager he would use chalk to make sidewalk art. At times he worked with his father, a house painter.

After high school he attended Cooper Union. Before he graduated, he was drafted into the army during World War II, where he served in a photo topography unit.

Art career 
After being discharged from the army he moved to Paris, where he attended the Académie de la Grande Chaumière, and Accademia di Belle Arti di Roma. He exhibited at the Galerie Huit.

He later moved back to Manhattan. The rise of abstract expressionism and the loss in popularity in figurative art prevent Kinigstein from being able to paint for a living. He worked in commercial art, where in 1961 he designed Bloomingdale's first collectible shopping bag. He also began drawing political cartoons criticizng abstract expressionism and the figures in the art world promoting it.

Kinigstein continued to paint for himself. He dubbed his style "figurative expressionism", and his painting frequently depict distorted figures in front of surreal backgrounds. At age 99 he continues to paint for two or three hours a day in his home.

Kinigstein's work is in the collection of the Museum of Modern Art, the Smithsonian American Art Museum, and the Whitney Museum of American Art.

Personal life 
Kinigstein has been married twice and has two children. His second wife is Eileen Muken Kinigstein.

Awards 
He is the recipient of a Fulbright Fellowship as well as a Louis Comfort Tiffany Foundation award.

Publications 
In 2014 a book of his cartoons entitled The Emperor's New Clothes: The Tower of Babel in the "Art" World was published by Fantagraphics Underground.

In 2022 Unrepentant Artist: The Paintings of Jonah Kinigstein was published.

References

External links
images of Kinigstein's work on ArtNet

1923 births
Living people
20th-century American male artists
American expatriates in France
American male painters
Artists from New York City